Sir Joshua Reynolds  (16 July 1723 – 23 February 1792) was an English painter who specialised in portraits. John Russell said he was one of the major European painters of the 18th century. He promoted the "Grand Style" in painting which depended on idealisation of the imperfect. He was a founder and first president of the Royal Academy of Arts, and was knighted by George III in 1769.

Early life

Reynolds was born in Plympton, Devon, on 16 July 1723, as the third son of the Reverend Samuel Reynolds, master of the Plympton Free Grammar School in the town. His father had been a fellow of Balliol College, Oxford, but did not send any of his sons to the university.
One of his sisters, seven years his senior, was Mary Palmer (1716–1794), author of Devonshire Dialogue, whose fondness for drawing is said to have had much influence on Joshua as a boy. In 1740 she provided £60, half of the premium paid to Thomas Hudson the portrait-painter, for Joshua's pupillage, and nine years she later advanced money for his expenses in Italy. His other siblings included Frances Reynolds and Elizabeth Johnson.

As a boy, he also came under the influence of Zachariah Mudge, whose Platonistic philosophy stayed with him all his life. Reynolds made extracts in his commonplace book from Theophrastus, Plutarch, Seneca, Marcus Antonius, Ovid, William Shakespeare, John Milton, Alexander Pope, John Dryden, Joseph Addison, Richard Steele, Aphra Behn, and copied passages on art theory by Leonardo da Vinci, Charles Alphonse Du Fresnoy, and André Félibien. The work that came to have the most influence on Reynolds was Jonathan Richardson's An Essay on the Theory of Painting (1715). Reynolds' annotated copy was lost for nearly two hundred years until it appeared in a Cambridge bookshop, inscribed with the signature ‘J. Reynolds Pictor’. It is now in the collection of the Royal Academy of Arts, London.

Career

Having shown an early interest in art, Reynolds was apprenticed in 1740 to the fashionable London portrait painter Thomas Hudson, who like Reynolds had been born in Devon. Hudson had a collection of Old Master drawings, including some by Guercino, of which Reynolds made copies.  Although apprenticed to Hudson for a period of four years, Reynolds remained with him only until the summer of 1743. Having left Hudson, Reynolds worked for some time as a portrait-painter in Plymouth Dock (now Devonport). He returned to London before the end of 1744, but following his father's death in late 1745 he shared a house in Plymouth Dock with his sisters.

In 1749, Reynolds met Commodore Augustus Keppel, who invited him to join HMS Centurion, of which he had command, on a voyage to the Mediterranean. While with the ship he visited Lisbon, Cadiz, Algiers and Minorca. From Minorca he travelled to Livorno in Italy, and then to Rome, where he spent two years, studying the Old Masters and acquiring a taste for the "Grand Style". Lord Edgcumbe, who had known Reynolds as a boy and introduced him to Keppel, suggested he should study with Pompeo Batoni, the leading painter in Rome, but Reynolds replied that he had nothing to learn from him. While in Rome he suffered a severe cold, which left him partially deaf, and, as a result, he began to carry the small ear trumpet with which he is often pictured.

Reynolds travelled homeward overland via Florence, Bologna, Venice, and Paris. He was accompanied by Giuseppe Marchi, then aged about 17. Apart from a brief interlude in 1770, Marchi remained in Reynolds' employment as a studio assistant for the rest of  the artist's career. Following his arrival in England in October 1752, Reynolds spent three months in Devon before establishing himself in London the following year and remaining there for the rest of his life. He took rooms in St Martin's Lane, before moving to Great Newport Street; his sister Frances acted as his housekeeper. He achieved success rapidly, and was extremely prolific. Lord Edgecumbe recommended the Duke of Devonshire and Duke of Grafton to sit for him, and other peers followed, including the Duke of Cumberland, third son of George II, in whose portrait, according to Nicholas Penny "bulk is brilliantly converted into power". In 1760 Reynolds moved into a large house, with space to show his works and accommodate his assistants, on the west side of Leicester Fields (now Leicester Square).

Alongside ambitious full-length portraits, Reynolds painted large numbers of smaller works. In the late 1750s, at the height of the social season, he received five or six sitters a day, each for an hour. By 1761 Reynolds could command a fee of 80 guineas for a full-length portrait; in 1764 he was paid 100 guineas for a portrait of Lord Burghersh.

The clothing of Reynolds' sitters was usually painted by either one of his pupils, his studio assistant Giuseppe Marchi, or the specialist drapery painter Peter Toms. James Northcote, his pupil, wrote of this arrangement that "the imitation of particular stuffs is not the work of genius, but is to be acquired easily by practice, and this was what his pupils could do by care and time more than he himself chose to bestow; but his own slight and masterly work was still the best." Lay figures were used to model the clothes.
 
Reynolds often adapted the poses of his subjects from the works of earlier artists, a practice mocked by Nathaniel Hone in a painting called The Conjuror submitted to the Royal Academy exhibition of 1775, and now in the collection of the National Gallery of Ireland. It shows a figure representing, though not resembling, Reynolds, seated in front of a cascade of prints from which Reynolds had borrowed with varying degrees of subtlety.

Although not known principally for his landscapes, Reynolds did paint in this genre. He had an excellent vantage from his house, Wick House, on Richmond Hill, and painted the view in about 1780.

Reynolds also was recognised for his portraits of children. He emphasised the innocence and natural grace of children when depicting them. His 1788 portrait, Age of Innocence, is his best known character study of a child. The subject of the painting is not known, although suggestions include Theophila Gwatkin, his great niece, and Lady Anne Spencer, the youngest daughter of the fourth Duke of Marlborough.

The Club
Reynolds worked long hours in his studio, rarely taking a holiday. He was gregarious and keenly intellectual, with many friends from London's intelligentsia, numbered amongst whom were Dr Samuel Johnson, Oliver Goldsmith, Edmund Burke, Giuseppe Baretti, Henry Thrale, David Garrick, and artist Angelica Kauffman. Johnson said in 1778: "Reynolds is too much under [Charles James] Fox and Burke at present. He is under the Fox star and the Irish constellation (meaning Burke). He is always under some planet".

Because of his popularity as a portrait painter, Reynolds enjoyed constant interaction with the wealthy and famous men and women of the day, and it was he who brought together the figures of "The Club". It was founded in 1764 and met in a suite of rooms on the first floor of the Turks Head at 9 Gerrard Street, now marked by a plaque. Original members included Burke, Bennet Langton, Topham Beauclerk, Goldsmith, Anthony Chamier, Thomas Hawkins, and Nugent, to be joined by Garrick, Boswell, and Sheridan. In ten years the membership had risen to 35. The Club met every Monday evening for supper and conversation and continued into the early hours of Tuesday morning. In later years, it met fortnightly during Parliamentary sessions. When in 1783 the landlord of the Turks Head died and the property was sold, The Club moved to Sackville Street.

Royal Academy

Reynolds was one of the earliest members of the Royal Society of Arts, helped found the Society of Artists of Great Britain, and in 1768 became the first president of the Royal Academy of Arts, a position he was to hold until his death. In 1769, he was knighted by George III, only the second artist to be so honoured.  His Discourses, a series of lectures delivered at the academy between 1769 and 1790, are remembered for their sensitivity and perception. In one lecture he expressed the opinion that "invention, strictly speaking, is little more than a new combination of those images which have been previously gathered and deposited in the memory." William Jackson in his contemporary essays said of Reynolds 'there is much ingenuity and originality in all his academic discourses, replete with classical knowledge of his art, acute remarks on the works of others,  and general taste and discernment'.

Reynolds and the Royal Academy received a mixed reception. Critics included William Blake who published the vitriolic Annotations to Sir Joshua Reynolds' Discourses in 1808. J. M. W. Turner and James Northcote were fervent acolytes: Turner requested he be laid to rest at Reynolds' side, and Northcote, who spent four years as Reynolds' pupil, wrote to his family "I know him thoroughly, and all his faults, I am sure, and yet almost worship him."
The Royal Academy of Art celebrated its 250th anniversary in 2018 from its opening in 1768. This became an impetus for galleries and museums across the UK to celebrate "the making, debating and exhibiting art at the Royal Academy". Waddesdon manor was amongst the historic houses that supported Sir Joshua Reynolds's influence at the academy, acknowledging how:

[He] transformed British painting with portraits and subject pictures that engaged their audience's knowledge, imagination, memory and emotions... As an eloquent teacher and art theorist, he used his role at the head of the Royal Academy to raise the status of art and artists of Britain.

Lord Keppel

In the Battle of Ushant against the French in 1778, Lord Keppel commanded the Channel Fleet and the outcome resulted in no clear winner; Keppel ordered the attack be renewed and was obeyed except by Sir Hugh Palliser, who commanded the rear, and the French escaped bombardment. A dispute between Keppel and Palliser arose and Palliser brought charges of misconduct and neglect of duty against Keppel and the Admiralty decided to court-martial him. On 11 February 1779 Keppel was acquitted of all charges and became a national hero. One of Keppel's lawyers commissioned Sir Nathaniel Dance-Holland to paint a portrait of Keppel, but Keppel redirected it to Reynolds. Reynolds alluded to Keppel's trial in the portrait by painting his hand on his sword, reflecting the presiding officer's words at the court-martial: "In delivering to you your sword, I am to congratulate you on its being restored to you with so much honour".

Principal Painter in Ordinary to the King
On 10 August 1784 Allan Ramsay died and the office of Principal Painter in Ordinary to King George III became vacant. Thomas Gainsborough felt that he had a good chance of securing it, but Reynolds felt he deserved it and threatened to resign the presidency of the Royal Academy if he did not receive it. Reynolds noted in his pocket book: "Sept. 1, 2½, to attend at the Lord Chancellor's Office to be sworn in painter to the King". It did not make Reynolds happy, however, as he wrote to Boswell: "If I had known what a shabby miserable place it is, I would not have asked for it; besides as things have turned out I think a certain person is not worth speaking to, nor speaking of", presumably meaning the king. Reynolds wrote to Jonathan Shipley, Bishop of St Asaph, a few weeks later: "Your Lordship congratulation on my succeeding Mr. Ramsay I take very kindly, but it is a most miserable office, it is reduced from two hundred to thirty-eight pounds per annum, the Kings Rat catcher I believe is a better place, and I am to be paid only a fourth part of what I have from other people, so that the Portraits of their Majesties are not likely to be better done now, than they used to be, I should be ruined if I was to paint them myself".

Lord Heathfield

In 1787 Reynolds painted the portrait of Lord Heathfield, who became a national hero for the successful defence of Gibraltar in the Great Siege from 1779 to 1783 against the combined forces of France and Spain. Heathfield is depicted against a background of clouds and cannon smoke, wearing the uniform of the 15th Light Dragoons and clasping the key of the Rock, its chain wrapped twice around his right hand. John Constable said in the 1830s that it was "almost a history of the defence of Gibraltar". Desmond Shawe-Taylor has claimed that the portrait may have a religious meaning, Heathfield holding the key similar to St. Peter (Jesus' "rock") possessing the keys to Heaven, Heathfield "the rock upon which Britannia builds her military interests".

Later life
In 1789, Reynolds lost the sight of his left eye, which forced him into retirement. In 1791 James Boswell dedicated his Life of Samuel Johnson to Reynolds. Reynolds  agreed with Burke's Reflections on the Revolution in France and, writing in early 1791, expressed his belief that the ancien régime of France had fallen due to spending too much time tending, as he puts it, to the splendor of the foliage, to the neglect of the stirring the earth about the roots. They cultivated only those arts which could add splendor to the nation, to the neglect of those which supported it – They neglected Trade & substantial Manufacture ... but does it follow that a total revolution is necessary that because we have given ourselves up too much to the ornaments of life, we will now have none at all. When attending a dinner at Holland House, Fox's niece Caroline was sat next to Reynolds and "burst out into glorification of the Revolution – and was grievously chilled and checked by her neighbour's cautious and unsympathetic tone".

On 4 June 1791 at a dinner at the Freemasons' Tavern to mark the king's birthday, Reynolds drank to the toasts "GOD save the KING!" and "May our glorious Constitution under which the arts flourish, be immortal!", in what was reported by the Public Advertiser as "a fervour truly patriotick". Reynolds "filled the chair with a most convivial glee". He returned to town from Burke's house in Beaconsfield and Edmond Malone wrote that "we left his carriage at the Inn at Hayes, and walked five miles on the road, in a warm day, without his complaining of any fatigue".

Later that month Reynolds suffered from a swelling over his left eye and had to be purged by a surgeon. In October he was too ill to take the president's chair and in November, Frances Burney recorded that I had long languished to see that kindly zealous friend, but his ill health had intimidated me from making the attempt": "He had a bandage over one eye, and the other shaded with a green half-bonnet. He seemed serious even to sadness, though extremely kind. 'I am very glad,' he said, in a meek voice and dejected accent, 'to see you again, and I wish I could see you better! but I have only one eye now, and hardly that.' I was really quite touched. On 5 November Reynolds, fearing he might not have an opportunity to write a will, wrote a memorandum intended to be his last will and testament, with Edmund Burke, Edmond Malone, and Philip Metcalfe named as executors. On 10 November Reynolds wrote to Benjamin West to resign the presidency, but the General Assembly agreed he should be re-elected, with Sir William Chambers and West to deputise for him.

Doctors Richard Warren and Sir George Baker believed Reynolds' illness to be psychological and they bled his neck "with a view of drawing the humour from his eyes" but the effect, in the view of his niece, was that it seemed "as if the 'principle of life' were gone" from Reynolds. On New Year's Day 1792 Reynolds became "seized with sickness", and from that time onwards could not keep food down.
Reynolds died on 23 February 1792 at his house at 47 Leicester Fields in London between eight and nine in the evening.

Burke was present on the night Reynolds died, and was moved within hours to write a eulogy of Reynolds, starting with the following sentiments: "Sir Joshua Reynolds was on very many accounts one of the most memorable men of his Time. He was the first Englishman who added the praise of the elegant Arts to the other Glories of his Country. In Taste, in grace, in facility, in happy invention, and in the richness and Harmony of colouring, he was equal to the great masters of the renowned Ages." Burke's tribute was well received and one journalist called it "the eulogium of Apelles pronounced by Pericles".

Reynolds was buried at St Paul's Cathedral. In 1903, a statue, by Alfred Drury, was erected in his honour in the Annenberg Courtyard of Burlington House, home of the Royal Academy. Around the statue are fountains and lights, installed in 2000, arranged in the pattern of a star chart at midnight on the night of Reynolds' birth. The planets are marked by granite discs, and the Moon by a water recess.

Personal characteristics

[[File:Joshua Reynolds (1723-1792) - Huang Ya Dong 'Wang-Y-Tong' - 129924 - National Trust.jpg|thumb|right|Huang Ya Dong 'Wang-Y-Tong''' (1776)]]

In appearance Reynolds was not striking. Slightly built, he was about 5'6" tall with dark brown curls, a florid complexion and features that James Boswell thought were "rather too largely and strongly limned." He had a broad face and a cleft chin, and the bridge of his nose was slightly dented; his skin was scarred by smallpox and his upper lip disfigured as a result of falling from a horse as a young man. Edmond Malone asserted however that "his appearance at first sight impressed the spectator with the idea of a well-born and well-bred English gentleman."

In his mature years he suffered from deafness, as recorded by Frances Burney, although this did not impede his lively social life.

Renowned for his placidity, Reynolds often claimed that he "hated nobody". This may be self-idealisation. It is well known that he disliked George Romney, whom he referred to only as "the man in Cavendish Square" and whom he successfully prevented from becoming a member of the Royal Academy. He did not like Gainsborough, yet appreciated his achievements in the obituary he wrote of his rival. (Rump; Kidson). It is said that when he taught in one of his "discourses" that a painter should not amass too much of the colour blue in the foreground of an image, Gainsborough was prompted to paint his famous "Blue Boy".

Never quite losing his Devonshire accent, Reynolds was not only an amiable and original conversationalist, but a friendly and generous host, so that Frances Burney recorded in her diary that he had "a suavity of disposition that set everybody at their ease in his society", and William Makepeace Thackeray believed "of all the polite men of that age, Joshua Reynolds was the finest gentleman". Dr Johnson commented on the "inoffensiveness" of his nature; Edmund Burke noted his "strong turn for humor". Thomas Bernard, who later became Bishop of Killaloe, wrote in his closing verses on Reynolds stating:

Thou say'st not only skill is gained
But genius too may be attained
By studious imitation;
Thy temper mild, thy genius fine
I'll copy till I make them mine
By constant application.

Some people, such as Hester Lynch Piozzi, construed Reynolds' equable calm as cool and unfeeling.

It is to this lukewarm temperament that Frederick W. Hilles, Bodman Professor of English Literature at Yale attributes Reynolds' never having married. In the editorial notes of his compendium Portraits by Sir Joshua Reynolds, Hilles theorises that "as a corollary one might say that he [Reynolds] was somewhat lacking in a capacity for love", and cites Boswell's notary papers: "He said the reason he would never marry was that every woman whom he liked had grown indifferent to him, and he had been glad he did not marry her." Reynolds' own sister, Frances, who lived with him as housekeeper, took her own negative opinion further still, thinking him "a gloomy tyrant". The presence of family compensated Reynolds for the absence of a wife; he wrote on one occasion to his friend Bennet Langton, that both his sister and niece were away from home "so that I am quite a bachelor". Reynolds did not marry, and had no known children.

Biographer Ian McIntyre discusses the possibility of Reynolds having enjoyed sexual relations with certain clients, such as Nelly O'Brien (or "My Lady O'Brien", as he playfully dubbed her) and Kitty Fisher, who visited his house for more sittings than were strictly necessary. Dan Cruickshank in his book London's Sinful Secret summarised Reynolds as having visited and re-visited various reputed red light districts in London after his return from Italy as a possible contributor to his medical condition and appearance due to commonly contracted disease in those areas of London.

Gallery

See also

English art
Grand manner
Mary Nesbitt, eighteenth-century courtesan who began her career as Reynolds' model.
Martin Postle, an expert on Joshua Reynolds

References

Referenced books
 James Boswell, Life of Johnson (Oxford: Oxford University Press, 2008).
 Charles  Robert  Leslie and Tom Taylor, Life and Times of Sir Joshua Reynolds (London: John Murray, 1865, 2 volumes).
 Ian McIntyre, Joshua Reynolds. The Life and Times of the First President of the Royal Academy (London: Allen Lane, 2003).
 Martin Postle, Reynolds, Sir Joshua (1723–1792), Oxford Dictionary of National Biography, Oxford University Press,  2004; online edn, October 2009. Retrieved 24 September 2010.

Further reading
 J. Blanc, Les Écrits de Sir Joshua Reynolds (Théorie de l'art (1400–1800) / Art Theory (1400–1800), 4), Turnhout, 2016, 
John Barrell, The Political Theory of Painting from Reynolds to Hazlitt (1986).
A. Graves and W. V. Cronin, A History of the Works of Sir Joshua Reynolds (1899–1901, 4 volumes).
F. W. Hilles, The Literary Career of Sir Joshua Reynolds (1936).
Derek Hudson, Sir Joshua Reynolds: A Personal Study (1958).

J. Ingamells and J. Edgcumbe (eds.), The Letters of Sir Joshua Reynolds (2000).
Alex Kidson, George Romney. 1734-1802 (2002)
E. Malone (ed.), The Works of Sir Joshua Reynolds (1798, 3 volumes).
D. Mannings, Sir Joshua Reynolds PRA, 1723–92 (1992).
D. Mannings, Sir Joshua Reynolds: A Complete Catalogue of his Paintings: The Subject Pictures Catalogued by Martin Postle (New Haven ad London, 2000)
H. Mount (ed.), Sir Joshua Reynolds, A Journey to Flanders and Holland (1996)
J. Northcote, Memoirs of Sir Joshua Reynolds, knt. (1813–15).
J. Northcote, The Life of Sir Joshua Reynolds (1818, 2nd edition, 2 volumes).
Martin Postle (ed.), Joshua Reynolds: The Creation of Celebrity (London: Tate, 2005). 
Martin Postle, Sir Joshua Reynolds: The Subject Pictures (1995).
Martin Postle, Drawings of Joshua Reynolds.
R. Prochno, Joshua Reynolds (1990).
Gerhard Charles Rump, George Romney (1734-1802). Zur Bildform der bürgerlichen Mitte in der Englischen Neoklassik. (1974)
S. Smiles (ed.), Sir Joshua Reynolds: The Acquisition of Genius (2009).
 Uglow, Jenny, "Big Talkers" (review of Leo Damrosch, The Club:  Johnson, Boswell, and the Friends Who Shaped an Age, Yale University Press, 473 pp.), The New York Review of Books, vol. LXVI, no. 9 (23 May 2019), pp. 26–28.
E. K. Waterhouse, Reynolds (1941).
E. K. Waterhouse, Reynolds'' (1973).
Joshua Reynolds, Discourses on Art (London, 1778); ed. R. R. Wark (New Haven and London, 1975)
N. Penny (ed.), Reynolds, exhibition catalogue, Paris Grand Palais, London, Royal Academy, 1986
Werner Busch, Hogarth's and Reynolds'Porträt des Schauspielers Garrick, in: Englishness. Beiträge zur englischen Kunst des 18. Jahrhunderts von Hogath bis Romney, Berlin and Munich 2010, pp. 57–76

External links

 
 
 Port Eliot House, home of the Earl of St. Germans contains many fine works by Reynolds, including a rare view of Plymouth
 'Sir Joshua Reynolds: The Acquisition of Genius' exhibition at Plymouth City Museum and Art Gallery - 21 November 2009 to 20 February 2010
 Frits Lugt, Les marques de collections de dessins & d'estampes, 1921 and its Supplement 1956, online edition
Sir Joshua Reynolds at Waddesdon Manor
 , engraved by Ambrose William Warren for The Easter Gift, 1832, with a poetical illustration by Letitia Elizabeth Landon

Collections
 The National Gallery: Sir Joshua Reynolds
 Works in the National Galleries of Scotland
 Liverpoolmuseums.org.uk
 GAC.culture.gov.uk
 Artcyclopedia: Sir Joshua Reynolds
 National Portrait Gallery Collection
 Sir Joshua Reynolds at Olga's Gallery
 Sir Joshua Reynolds, A Complete Catalogue of His Paintings (book-bound)

Electronic editions
 
 
 

English portrait painters
1723 births
1792 deaths
Artist authors
Fellows of the Royal Society
People from Plympton
Principal Painters in Ordinary
Royal Academicians
Streathamites
Knights Bachelor
Burials at St Paul's Cathedral
18th-century English painters
18th-century English male artists
English male painters
Sibling artists
Waddesdon Manor